Psi Islands is a group of small islands which lie close to the west side of Lambda Island in the Melchior Islands, Palmer Archipelago. The name, derived from the 23rd letter of the Greek alphabet, appears to have been first used on a 1946 Argentine government chart following surveys of these islands by Argentine expeditions in 1942 and 1943.

See also 
 Composite Antarctic Gazetteer
 List of Antarctic and sub-Antarctic islands
 List of Antarctic islands south of 60° S
 SCAR
 Territorial claims in Antarctica

References

External links 

Islands of the Palmer Archipelago